Katherine Albrecht is a consumer privacy advocate , Vice President (VP) of Startpage.com and spokesperson against radio-frequency identification (RFID). Albrecht devised the term "spy chips" to describe RFID tags such as those embedded in passport cards and certain enhanced United States driver's licenses. Katherine Albrecht holds a Doctor of Education degree from Harvard University. She is a resident of Nashua, New Hampshire.

Albrecht was interviewed about RFID chips in Aaron Russo's 2006 documentary America: From Freedom to Fascism.

Publications

Books
Albrecht and Liz McIntyre (CASPIAN's communications director) co-authored the book Spychips: How Major Corporations and Government Plan to Track Your Every Move, which won the November 2005 Lysander Spooner Award for advancing the literature of liberty. The book lays out the potential implications of RFID on privacy and civil liberties. RFID industry representatives have criticized it, claiming the authors exaggerate some RFID privacy threats. In a lengthy rebuttal, Albrecht asked why critics don't "mention sworn patent documents from IBM describing ways to secretly follow innocent people in libraries, theaters, and public restrooms through the RFID tags in their clothes and belongings? Where is […] outrage over BellSouth's patent-pending plans to pick through our garbage and skim the data contained in the RFID tags we discard?"

Articles and papers
 Albrecht, Katherine. "Supermarket Cards: The Tip of the Retail Surveillance Iceberg."  Denver University Law Review, Volume 79, Issue 4, Summer 2002. pp. 534–539 and 558–565.
 Position Paper on the Use of RFID in Consumer Products. Co-authored with Liz McIntyre and Beth Givens. November 14, 2003. 
 "RFID: The Doomsday Scenario." In: RFID: Applications, Security, and Privacy, eds. S. Garfinkel and B. Rosenberg. New Jersey: Addison Wesley. 2006. pp. 259–273.
 "RFID: The Big Brother Bar Code." (Co-authored with Liz McIntyre) ALEC Policy Forum, Winter 2004, Volume 6, Number 3, pp. 49–54.

Radio talk show host

Previously, she hosted a two-hour daily program called Uncovering the Truth with Katherine Albrecht on the We The People Radio Network (WTPRN) from April 2007 until the network ceased all programming in October 2008. Albrecht later broadcast The Dr. Katherine Albrecht Show on the GCN Radio network until 2016.

Religious beliefs
Albrecht believes that RFID chips and other emerging technologies could lead to the Mark of the Beast. She has written a children's book called I Won't Take the Mark: A Bible Book and Contract for Children.

See also
 Microchip implant (human)

References

External links 
 Official Website
 Spy Chips Website
 Albrecht's rebuttal to RFID industry criticism
 Official CASPIAN Website

Consumer rights activists
Living people
Radio-frequency identification
1968 births
Harvard Graduate School of Education alumni